

Events

January
 2 January – British sitcom Mr. Bean starring Rowan Atkinson premieres on the ABC.
 13 January – Network Ten undergoes a major rebrand, launching as "The Entertainment Network" and introducing a new logo, which remained in use until October 2018.
 17 January – Seven Network's long running breakfast program Sunrise makes its first broadcast.
 22 January – Australian sitcom All Together Now premieres on Nine Network.

February
 8 February – French-American-Canadian animated series Inspector Gadget ends its afternoon run on ABC. The series will later shift to air on Sunday mornings on 22 December of that year.
 11 February – The ABC premieres the sitcom Eggshells starring Garry McDonald.

March
 March – Tony Barber and Alyce Platt announced that they will quit hosting the quiz show Sale of the Century.
 15 March – Steve Vizard wins the 1991 Gold Logie.
 16 March – The producers of soap opera Neighbours have reported that star Beth Buchanan (sister of ex-Hey Dad star Simone) is going to leave the series when her contract expires in June.
 17 March – ABC debuts a new Sunday morning children's wrapper programme called Couch Potato presented by Australian actor Grant Piro.
 19 March – Australian children's series Johnson and Friends premieres in New Zealand on TVNZ's Channel 2 as part of the After 2 children's block.

April
 April – Glenn Ridge and Jo Bailey replace Tony Barber and Alyce Platt on Sale of the Century.
 6 April – Network Ten's troubled soap opera Neighbours is set to lose a record number of cast members as many of them have contract renewals coming up. Ian Williams, who plays medical student Adam Willis, is confirmed to be leaving, while co-star Lucinda Cowden who plays Melanie Pearson is also believed to be quitting when their contracts expire.
 30 April – ABC's live comedy series The Big Gig returns with a new series.
 6 April – Network Ten's disgraced soap opera Neighbours is set to lose never more than 25 actors along with 200 crew people, being terminated from their roles as part of the severe revamp. The names were Ian Smith (Harold Bishop), Lucinda Cowden (Melanie Pearson), Stefan Dennis (Paul Robinson), Gayle and Gillian Blakeney (Caroline & Christina Aleesi), Mark Little (Joe Mangel), Kristian Schimid (Todd Landers), Jeremy Angerson (Josh Anderson), Beth Buchanan (Gemma Ramsay), Amelia Frid (Cody Willis), Ben Guerens (Toby Mangel), Miranda Fryer (Sky Bishop) and Ian Williams (Adam Willis). Joining the shamed series will be former Cleo covergirl of the year Rachel Blakely and former models Scott Michaelson and Andrew Williams.

May
 13 May – Triple J presenter and radio announcer Michael Tunn takes over as presenter of the Australian weekday magazine series The Afternoon Show.
 15 May – Canadian teen drama series Degrassi High, the third in the Degrassi trilogy series makes its debut on ABC.
 30 May – Australian sitcom All Together Now premieres in New Zealand, screening on Channel 2.
 30 May – A spinoff of the Australian comedy series Hey Dad...! called Hampton Court airs on Seven Network running for only one season and a total of thirteen episodes. It was later axed after the final episode on 22 August.

June
 1 June – Reruns of the classic ABC drama series Patrol Boat are now airing on Network Ten.
 3 June – Neighbours premieres in America, airing on KCOP-TV in Los Angeles, CA. Two weeks later, the series debuts on WWOR-TV, New York.
 10 June – British children's animated series Postman Pat and Tugs premiere on ABC.
 15 June – Hey Hey It's Saturday begins airing on Channel 2 in New Zealand.
 24 June – ABC debuts its new children's game show Big Square Eye hosted by ex-Neighbours star Bob La Castra.

July
 4 July – British long running soap opera series EastEnders airs on ABC for the very last time due to the show not getting any more episodes from the UK where it originally came from, although it was later repeated on UKTV on cable television.
 16 July – Australian live comedy series The Big Gig airs its final episode on ABC.
 19 July – Ron Casey and Normie Rowe receive a massive punch-up live on Midday with Ray Martin. In Neighbours, Harold Bishop has had a massive heart attack in the Coffee Shop.
 30 July – Johnson and Friends makes it debut in the UK on the BBC.

August
 9 August – Final episode of the Australian children's sitcom Pugwall screens on Nine Network.
 13 August – Australian children's series Adventures on Kythera premiers on the Nine Network, its first broadcast in Australia. The series debuted in the UK and Ireland two years ago.
 15 August – American talk show The Oprah Winfrey Show makes its debut on Network Ten as a late-night program.

September
 7 September – Neighbours star Richard Huggett, who plays Jim Robinson's half-son Glen Donnelly has told producers that he will not be renewing his contract when it expires in November. He will be seen on air until February 1992.
 7 September – Johnson and Friends premieres in South Africa on M-Net as part of their children's block K-T.V..
 19 September – Network Ten's shamed soap opera Neighbours airs a tragic episode: Joe Mangel proposes to Melanie Pearson announce they will immigrate to the UK, Adam Willis leaves Ramsay Street for Europe, Harold Bishop is murdered off the coast while on holidays with Madge to Tasmania – this was the final episode.

October
 25 October – In Neighbours, Joe Mangel, Melanie Pearson and Sky Bishop depart.
 30 October – The second series of Johnson and Friends debuts at 4:30pm on ABC.

November
 5 November – The hit long running British science fiction series Doctor Who returns on ABC after a long absence since its last air in mid 1990, starting off with the fourth serial of Season 17 Nightmare of Eden and ending with the seventh and final serial of Season 18 Logopolis in early 1992. A convention of the series is also being held at the local Noah's on the Beach hotel in Newcastle, New South Wales.
 6 November – Star Trek: The Next Generation, a sequel to the American science fiction television series in the Star Trek franchise, premieres on the Nine Network and is shown every Wednesday at 7:30pm.
 6 November – Johnson and Friends begins airing in Ireland on RTÉ Network 2 as part of The Den, a wrap-around programme for children.

December
 December – The Seven Network wins the 1991 ratings year with a record of 33.8% share for Total People. This is the fifth consecutive year the network had won in primetime.
 3 December – American sitcom The Fresh Prince of Bel-Air starring American rapper Will Smith makes it debut on Nine Network. American teen sitcom Parker Lewis Can't Lose also debuts on Nine on the same day.
 19 December – Australian children's television series Johnson and Friends is sold to television markets across Canada for the first time ever. The first television channel to air the series in Canada was Knowledge Network in British Columbia.
 22 December – Inspector Gadget returns to the ABC after a very long absence with the series now broadcasting every Sunday morning.
 27 December – Australian children's series Fat Cat and Friends airs on Seven Network for the very last time. The series was then cancelled due to the Australian Broadcasting Tribunal claiming that it was not educational enough and not clearly defined and it will might confuse young children.
 30 December – Australian children's series The Book Place debuts on Seven Network.
 31 December – The Northern New South Wales television market is aggregated, with Prime Television taking a Seven Network affiliation, NBN taking a Nine Network affiliation & NRTV (now Southern Cross Ten) taking a Network Ten affiliation.
 Whole year – Hey Hey It's Saturday tours Australia, celebrating the show's 20th Anniversary, touring Adelaide, Perth, Brisbane, including the opening of Warner Bros. Movie World on the Gold Coast and Warner Bros. Studios in Hollywood.

Debuts

Domestic

International

Changes to network affiliation
This is a list of programs which made their premiere on an Australian television network that had previously premiered on another Australian television network. The networks involved in the switch of allegiances are predominantly both free-to-air networks or both subscription television networks. Programs that have their free-to-air/subscription television premiere, after previously premiering on the opposite platform (free-to air to subscription/subscription to free-to air) are not included. In some cases, programs may still air on the original television network. This occurs predominantly with programs shared between subscription television networks.

Domestic

International

Television shows

ABC TV
 Mr. Squiggle and Friends (1959–1999)
 Four Corners (1961–present)
 Rage (1987–present)
 G.P. (1989–1996)

Seven Network
 Wheel of Fortune (1981–1996, 1996–2003, 2004–06)
 A Country Practice (1981–1994)
 Home and Away (1988–present)
 Family Feud (1988–1996)
 Fast forward (1989–1992)

Nine Network
 Sale of the Century (1980–2001)
 A Current Affair (1971–1978, 1988–present)
 Hey Hey It's Saturday (1971–1999)
 The Midday Show (1973–1998)
 60 Minutes (1979–present)
 Sunday (1981–2008)
 Today (1982–present)
 The Flying Doctors (1986–1991)
 Australia's Funniest Home Video Show (1990–present)
 Golden Fiddles (1991)

Network Ten
 Neighbours (1985–present)
 E Street (1989–1993)
 Til Ten (1989–1991)

Ending this year

See also
 1991 in Australia
 List of Australian films of 1991

References